Narimanovo (Nariman) is a rural locality (a village) in Chekmagushevsky District, Bashkortostan, Russia. The population was 315 as of 2010. There are 3 streets.

Geography 
Narimanovo is located 4 km north of Chekmagush (the district's administrative centre) by road. Chekmagush is the nearest rural locality.

References 

Rural localities in Chekmagushevsky District